The 1947 Central Michigan Chippewas football team represented Central Michigan College of Education, later renamed Central Michigan University, as an independent during the 1947 college football season. In their first season under head coach Lyle Bennett, the Chippewas compiled a 2–5–1 record and were outscored by their opponents by a combined total of 136 to 105. The team opened its season with a 34–14 loss to the Detroit Titans on September 19, 1947. The highlights of the season were shutout victories over Northern Michigan (45-0) on October 17, 1947, and Michigan State Normal (33-0) on November 1, 1947.

Lyle Bennett was hired as the school's head football coach on January 22, 1947, following the elevation of Ron Finch to be head of the school's department of health and education. An alumnus of Central Michigan, Bennett had worked as a trainer for the Michigan Wolverines men's track and field team before accepting a position as an assistant football coach at Central Michigan in 1946.

Schedule

References

Central Michigan
Central Michigan Chippewas football seasons
Central Michigan Chippewas football